The Fayetteville-Manlius Central School District (F-M) is a K-12 public school district located in the Town of Manlius in Central New York, enrolling approximately 4,800 students. F-M serves a large portion of the Town of Manlius, including the villages of Manlius and Fayetteville, as well as portions of Jamesville and Pompey. The district is partially funded by and governed under the authority of the New York State Education Department, whose standardized examinations are designed and administered by the Board of Regents of the University of the State of New York.

The district has been recognized statewide and nationally for academic and athletic excellence. In 2015, the high school was ranked #79 in the nation in Newsweek's list of "America's Top High Schools". As of 2019, Fayetteville-Manlius Senior High School was ranked #86 within New York State.

District history

Establishing the district
The F-M School District was established in 1951, when the then independent Fayetteville, Manlius and 11 other smaller districts united. Fayetteville High School and Manlius High School remained separate until 1954, when the Manlius School became the Jr. High (7–8) for the whole district and the Fayetteville school became the Fayetteville-Manlius High School (9–12). The new Fayetteville–Manlius High School was constructed in Manlius and first opened in 1960. The former Fayetteville-Manlius High School was renamed to the current Wellwood Middle School in 1965. Manlius High School became Pleasant Street Elementary, which was closed in 1975, sold and is currently a church and daycare. From the time it was formed until the present, the district has been led by only five superintendents.

The Oak Tree and the Hornet

The oak tree is the symbol of the F-M School District and its heritage. A 200-year-old oak stood in front of what is now Wellwood Middle School until it was removed in the 1970s. The characteristics of the tree are reflected in the values, vision, and ambition of Fayetteville-Manlius. The tree is a steadfast, well-grounded, robust, and distinguished entity on the natural landscape. The hornet is the school mascot, and also came from the hornets who nested in the great oak tree. A historical narrative is given by former teacher and assistant principal at F-M High School, Mr. Platt Wheeler:

Notable academic achievement
 Science Olympiad
2004 National Champions
Other National Finishes: 3rd Place, 2005, 4th Place, 2000, 2006 & 2007, 5th Place 2009
Ten consecutive first-place finishes at New York State Championships (2003–2012).
 2005 gold medal and 2006 blue ribbon, Expansion Management magazine's Education Quotient
 1999, 2000, and 2006 GRAMMY Signature School
 National Blue Ribbon School of Excellence Awards (Eagle Hill Middle School, 2011; Enders Road Elementary School, 2014; Mott Road Elementary School, 2020; Fayetteville Elementary School, 2021)
 Six times named one of the American Music Conference's "Best 100 Communities for Music Education in America".
 The district is consistently honored by the Scholastic Art and Writing Awards as having one of the best high school art programs in the country. In 2006, students from F-M High School received a record number of national awards, including the prestigious National American Vision Award.
 The state-of-the art observatory and planetarium are some of the only facilities of their kind on a public high school campus.
 The district consistently exceeds average state and national performances on the SAT. In addition, 99% of F-M students take the exam at least once. The average scores for the Class of 2010 are as follows:

Notable alumni
 Steve Altes (1980), humorist, graphic novelist, and co-recipient of the National Medal of Technology
 Laurie Halse Anderson (1979), New York Times bestselling author and National Book Award finalist for the novel Speak
 Nina Fedoroff (1960), professor of life sciences at Pennsylvania State University; science and technology adviser to U.S. Secretary of State Hillary Clinton
 Sonia Kreitzer (2002), singer-songwriter known as Doe Paoro based in Los Angeles 
 Jonathan Murray (1973), television producer and co-creator of MTV's The Real World, Road Rules, and The Challenge
 Tom Rafferty (1972), former professional football player for the Dallas Cowboys
 Chris Wedge (1975), Academy Award-winning filmmaker known for directing Ice Age, Robots, Epic, and Monster Trucks

Demographics
As of the 2005–06 school year, there were 4771 students enrolled in the Fayetteville-Manlius Central School District, with an individual grade enrollment low of 301 students in grade three and a high of 421 in grade seven. The racial/ethnic makeup of the student population was 91.0% White, 1.9% Black or African American, 5.6% Asian or Pacific Islander, and 1.3% Hispanic. Approximately 1.2% of the population, or 58 students, demonstrated limited English proficiency. Only 0.9% of the student body qualified for a reduced lunch price, and 2.9% were eligible for a free lunch.

There were 352 teachers employed in the school district, which calculates to a student to teacher ratio of approximately 13.55:1, though it is noted that the average ratio in eighth grade, and tenth grade core classes ranged from 19–25 students per teacher.

Schools
High School (Grades 9–12):
Fayetteville–Manlius High School8201 E. Seneca TurnpikeManlius, NY 13104
Dr. Raymond W. Kilmer, Principal
Mr. Patrick McNamara, Assistant Principal
Ms. Stephanie Rice, Assistant Principal
Ms. Karen A. Liparulo, Assistant Principal
Middle Schools (Grades 5–8):
Eagle Hill Middle School,4645 Enders RoadManlius, NY 13104
Ms. Maureen McCrystal, Principal
Ms. Krissy Purcell, Assistant Principal
Wellwood Middle School (formerly Fayetteville High School),700 South Manlius StreetFayetteville, NY 13066
Ms. Melissa K. Corbin, Principal
Ms. Trisha Fogarty, Assistant Principal
Elementary Schools (Grades K–4):
Enders Road Elementary School,4725 Enders RoadManlius, NY 13104
Dr. Deborah Capri, Principal
Fayetteville Elementary School,704 South Manlius StreetFayetteville, NY 13066
Ms. Eileen Lux, Principal
Mott Road Elementary School,7173 Mott RoadFayetteville, NY 13066
Ms. Jonna A. Johnson, Principal

Organization

Fayetteville-Manlius' six schools are spread over four separate campuses in the village of Fayetteville and just west of the village of Manlius. Elementary and middle school students attend a particular school based on their residence within the district. Students entering Eagle Hill are typically from Enders Road and a portion of Mott Road, and those entering Wellwood are from Fayetteville Elementary (Fay El) and the majority of Mott Road. Students from both middle schools go on to the high school.

The district offices, varsity athletic facilities, maintenance facilities, planetarium and observatory are located on the High School campus. The transportation department is located on the Fay El/Wellwood Campus

Administration
Dr. Craig J. Tice has been Superintendent of Schools since July 1, 2015. He replaced Dr. Corliss Kaiser, who retired after 10 years as the F-M superintendent. Dr. Tice served as the superintendent of the Marcellus Central School District since 2006. F-M administrative supporting staff include:
 Mr. William Furlong, Assistant Superintendent for Business Services
 Dr. Mary Coughlin, Assistant Superintendent for Instruction
 Mr. Jeffrey Gordon, Assistant Superintendent for Personnel
 Ms. Amy Evans, Assistant Superintendent for Special Services
 Mr. Russell McCarty, Superintendent for Building and Grounds

Board of education
Fayetteville-Manlius Board of Education members are elected by popular vote, and serve three-year terms, beginning on July 1 of the year elected. Current members (with term expiration dates in parentheses) are:
 Marissa Joy Mims, President (2024)
 Sharon Lindars, Vice President (2024)
 Jason Catalino (2023)
 Rebecca Cohen (2023)
 Kelly Fumarola (2023)
 Elena A. Romano (2022)
 Daniel Seidberg (2024)
 Mark Vislosky (2022)
 Daryll Fitch Wheeler (2022)

Athletics

F-M Athletics are renowned around the state and the country for competitive superiority, sportsmanship and academic integrity. The district's 32 varsity teams compete in the Colonial Division of the Onondaga High School League (OHSL), Section III of the New York State Public High School Athletic Association (NYSPHSAA), and Section III of the New York State Scholastic Rowing Association. Many teams also have modified, freshman and junior varsity components.

In recent years, F-M has made a significant statement on the national stage in boys' tennis, running, girls' lacrosse, and boys' soccer. The district is home to the boys tennis team which is undefeated for over 20 years, with over 200 consecutive wins. The district is home to the current national #1 girls' cross country team, who won their fifth straight Nike Cross Nationals competition on December 4, 2010. Additionally, the boys' cross country team finished as high as 2nd in the nation in 2004 and 2010 and girls lacrosse finished as high as 3rd in the nation in 2005. The 2020 boys soccer team finished with a record of 11–0, the best in the league, section, state, and the team was ranked 3rd in the nation by the United Soccer Coaches. Unfortunately, the cancellation of postseason play including sectionals and states was announced prior to the start of the regular season due to the coronavirus pandemic which led to the cancellation of sports within the Syracuse City School District which meant three teams (Nottingham, Henniger, and Corcoran) would not participate in league play. A wide variety of teams claim OHSL and NYSPHSAA Section III championships every year, and the vast majority of teams are honored with NYS Scholar Athlete Awards.

Alma mater
F-M's alma mater is a stoic symbol of the district's heritage. It is most commonly sung as a fight song (with the words "fight, fight, fight" appended to the "Truth shall be thy light" line), and is customarily sung at graduation ceremonies. The lyrics are as follows, sung to the tune of Aura Lee:

See also
List of high schools in New York
List of school districts in New York

References

External links
 NYS Education Department 2006 Report Card
District Links
Fayetteville-Manlius Central School District Homepage
F-M Education Foundation
F-M Alumni
Official Site of the Class of 1982

School districts established in 1951
School districts in New York (state)
Education in Onondaga County, New York
Manlius, New York
1951 establishments in New York (state)